British Overseas NGOs for Development (commonly called Bond) is the United Kingdom  membership body for non-governmental organisations (NGOs) working in international development. Established in 1993, Bond now has over 400 members. These range from large bodies with a worldwide presence to smaller, specialist organisations working in certain regions or with specific groups of people.

Bond is a registered charity under English law.

Bond promotes, supports, represents and, on occasion, leads the work and interests of UK international development organisations.

Campaigns coordinated by Bond include #ProudOfAid, Enough Food For Everyone IF, Make Poverty History and Vote Global.

In 2021, as part of wider cuts to the UK aid budget, the funding for Bond from the FCDO was halved.

See also
National Council for Voluntary Organisations

References

External links
Bond's website
Make Poverty History
The Guardian - Date Aid: are charities sending the wrong message?

Development charities based in the United Kingdom
Charities based in London